Aq Kand-e Baruq (also Romanized as Āq Kand-e Bārūq) is a village in Baruq Rural District, Baruq District, Miandoab County, West Azerbaijan Province, Iran. At the 2006 census, its population was 460, in 95 families.

References 

Populated places in Miandoab County